Laura Bailey (born ) is an American voice actress. She made her anime debut as Kid Trunks in the Funimation dub of Dragon Ball Z. Her other anime credits include Emily / Glitter Lucky in Glitter Force, Tohru Honda in Fruits Basket, Lust in Fullmetal Alchemist and Fullmetal Alchemist: Brotherhood, the title character in the Funimation dub of Shin-Chan, and Maka Albarn in Soul Eater. She is a cast member of the web series Critical Role, playing Vex'ahlia ("Vex"), Jester Lavorre, and Imogen Temult.

In video games, Bailey has voiced Rayne in the BloodRayne franchise, Kira Carsen in Star Wars: The Old Republic, Jaina Proudmoore in World of Warcraft, Rise Kujikawa in Persona 4, the Female Protagonist in Persona 3 Portable, Chun-Li in Street Fighter, Serah Farron in Final Fantasy XIII, the title role in Catherine, Serana in The Elder Scrolls V: Skyrim – Dawnguard, Oriana Lawson in Mass Effect 3, Lucina in Fire Emblem Awakening, Abigail "Fetch" Walker in Infamous Second Son and First Light, Fiona in Tales from the Borderlands, Nadine Ross in Uncharted 4: A Thief's End and The Lost Legacy, and Kait Diaz in Gears of War. In 2020, she starred as Abby Anderson in the video game The Last of Us Part II, for which she won the BAFTA Award for Best Performer in a Leading Role and Best Performance at The Game Awards.

Bailey has voiced Catwoman in Batman: The Telltale Series, Supergirl in Injustice 2, Mary Jane Watson in Spider-Man and Black Widow in a number of Marvel projects, particularly the TV show Avengers Assemble and the 2020 Avengers video game.

Early life
Bailey was born in Mississippi on May 28, 1981. She has an older sister named Jenny. Her father was in the Air Force, causing the family to move around frequently. They lived in Oklahoma before moving to San Antonio, Texas, and then moved throughout North Texas, all before Bailey was six years old. They eventually settled in Allen, Texas, a suburb of Dallas. She had a passing interest in acting and performed in school plays, but was planning to become a biologist. She did not realize she could make a career out of acting until she watched a Dawson's Creek behind-the-scenes special in which Katie Holmes was interviewed. She attended the theatre program at Collin County Community College in Plano, Texas, where she participated in productions of the plays Suburbia, Through a Glass Onion, and Don't Rock the Jukebox.

Career

Voice acting 

Voice actor Kent Williams spotted Bailey at one of her college plays and invited her to audition for Funimation while they were working on Dragon Ball Z. Her first major role on Dragon Ball Z was Kid Trunks, which she portrayed with a raspy voice. She voiced the starring character Marlene Angel in Blue Gender, which was the first project Funimation did outside of the Dragon Ball world, and Keiko Yukimura in Yu Yu Hakusho, which ran on Cartoon Network.

Bailey was cast for the starring role of Tohru Honda in the anime Fruits Basket. She said that Tohru's character has helped her be more positive: "I was so inspired by her character by her, joy, and outlook on life that, you know, you wanna emulate that." She later voiced Lust, one of the villains in Fullmetal Alchemist, and Sana Kurata in Kodocha.

Bailey had been working with Funimation for about four years before she started ADR directing. She worked on Blue Gender: The Warrior and some episodes of Case Closed. Her first major ADR directing project was Gunslinger Girl, in which she also voices Henrietta. She also co-directed parts of Kodocha. She became a line producer for the Funimation dub of Shin-Chan and also voiced the title character.

Bailey's video game voice roles include Rayne in the BloodRayne franchise, Jaina Proudmoore in World of Warcraft, Rise Kujikawa in Persona 4, the Female Protagonist in Persona 3 Portable, Chun-Li in Street Fighter, Serah Farron in Final Fantasy XIII, Blaze the Cat in Sonic the Hedgehog, the title role in Catherine, Serana in The Elder Scrolls V: Skyrim – Dawnguard DLC, Multiple characters in Fallout: New Vegas,  Lucina in Fire Emblem Awakening, Abigail "Fetch" Walker in Infamous Second Son and First Light, Fiona in Tales from the Borderlands, Spartan Olympia Vale in Halo 5: Guardians, Nadine Ross in Uncharted 4: A Thief's End and The Lost Legacy, and Kait Diaz in Gears of War.

In 2020, Bailey starred as Abby Anderson in the video game The Last of Us Part II, a role which won her the BAFTA Award for Best Performer in a Leading Role and the Best Performance award at The Game Awards 2020. In 2022, Bailey was nominated for Best VA Performance (EN) at the Crunchyroll Anime Awards.

Live action 
In addition to her voice over roles, Bailey has also appeared in several live action productions. In 2001, she played a minor role in an episode of Walker, Texas Ranger (titled "Saturday Night") as the daughter of a club owner (Frank Stallone Jr.) with ties to the Mafia. She later had a brief appearance in an episode of One Tree Hill ("It gets worse at night"), which was filmed in Texas. She has appeared in the films Mr. Brooks, Ruffian, and The Staircase Murders.

Bailey is also a cast member of the popular Dungeons & Dragons web series Critical Role, where she played Vex'ahlia ("Vex") in Campaign One, Jester Lavorre in Campaign Two, and Imogen Temult (Campaign three.). Critical Role was both the Webby Winner and the People's Voice Winner in the "Games (Video Series & Channels)" category at the 2019 Webby Awards; the show was also both a Finalist and the Audience Honor Winner at the 2019 Shorty Awards. After becoming hugely successful, the Critical Role cast left the Geek & Sundry network in early 2018 and set up their own production company, Critical Role Productions. Soon after, they aimed to raise $750,000 on Kickstarter to create an animated series of their first campaign, but ended up raising over $11 million. In November 2019, Amazon Prime Video announced that they had acquired the streaming rights to this animated series, now titled The Legend of Vox Machina; Bailey reprises her role as Vex. Bailey is also one of the narrators for the audiobook edition of the novel Critical Role: Vox Machina – Kith & Kin (2021).

Bailey made a appearance in the season finale of HBO's live-action adaptation of The Last of Us in a cameo role as a nurse.

Personal life

Bailey was roommates with voice actress Colleen Clinkenbeard while the two worked at Funimation.

On September 25, 2011, Bailey married voice actor Travis Willingham in Camarillo. They had briefly dated when they were younger, and reconnected later on. They live in Los Angeles. They have a son.

Filmography

Anime

Animation

Feature films

Direct-to-video and television films

Video games

Live-action

Notes

References

Other references

External links

 
 
 
 

Living people
1981 births
Actresses from Mississippi
American television actresses
American video game actresses
American voice actresses
American web series actresses
Place of birth missing (living people)
American women television producers
American voice directors
Funimation
20th-century American actresses
21st-century American actresses
BAFTA winners (people)
The Game Awards winners